Christopher Paget (born 2 November 1987) is an English cricketer. Born in Stafford, he is a right-handed batsman and a right-arm offbreak bowler who has played for Derbyshire since 2004.

At the time of his debut, he was the youngest ever player to line up for the Derbyshire team in the Championship, at 16 years and 282 days. Paget quickly proved to be an off-spinner remarkably adept at achieving the scalps of right-handers, such as those of the West Indian touring team of 2004. In his debut season, he played four matches, taking three wickets at an average of 68.66.

In his County Championship debut, in the same year, he was to prove expensive in a draw at Headingley against Derbyshire. He appeared in two more matches in the same month of August 2004, and has since lined up for the team in the Second XI Championship. In 2007, Paget represented Durham UCCE.

References

External links
Christopher Paget at Cricket Archive
  Christopher Paget at Cricinfo

1987 births
English cricketers
Living people
Derbyshire cricketers
Paget, Christopher
Durham MCCU cricketers
Lincolnshire cricketers